Ruination is the second studio album by American death metal band Job for a Cowboy. The follow-up to their first studio album Genesis, Ruination was recorded and mixed at AudioHammer studios in Sanford, Florida with producer Jason Suecof. It was released July 7, 2009, through Metal Blade Records. The album sold around 10,600 copies in the United States in its first week of release to debut at position No. 42 on The Billboard 200 chart.  It was the group's first album to feature drummer Jon Rice and  guitarist Al Glassman and the last to feature guitarist Bobby Thompson, guitarist Ravi Bhadriraju and bassist Brent Riggs.

Background
Following the departure of guitarist Ravi Bhadriraju, who left Job for a Cowboy to go back to medical school—being replaced by former Despised Icon guitarist Al Glassman, the band recorded demo tracks with producer Jason Suecof. Vocalist Jonny Davy stated in an interview with Way Too Loud!, that this material differs from the band's first full-length, to have "a bit of an old-school [death metal] touch." Davy also explained when interviewed by MetalSucks, before the release of the album, that Job for a Cowboy are "in with new influences with the next record", but not going to be a drastic shift in comparison with Genesis. He also said, "We’re just learning from our mistakes and nit picking everything and evolving as a band."

Lyrical themes
According to frontman Jonny Davy, the ideas involved with Ruination branch off from 2007's Genesis, but are more politically based. The topics addressed by the album's schema revolve around modern-day worldwide dilemmas and controversial issues including "propaganda in the mainstream media and television, human rights in North Korea, the modern genocidal government of Nubia , the use of torture in American military tactics, consequences of nuclear war, and overruling by world governments and police states/martial law." Ruination is politically based, but not a concept album as its predecessor Genesis.

Track listing

Personnel

Job for a Cowboy
Jon Rice – drums
Brent Riggs – bass guitar, backing vocals
Bobby Thompson – guitar
Jonny Davy – lead vocals
Al Glassman – guitar
Ravi Bhadriraju - guitar on "Unfurling a Darkened Gospel"

Production
Jason Suecof – production, engineering, mixing
Mark Lewis, Ronnie Miller – assistant engineers
Alan Douches – mastering
Brent Elliott White – artwork
Brian J. Ames – layout design
Brian Slagel – A&R

References

External links
Ruination at Metal Blade Records

2009 albums
Job for a Cowboy albums
Metal Blade Records albums
Albums produced by Jason Suecof